Joss Williams was a special effects supervisor.

On January 24, 2012, he won an Oscar for the film Hugo. He shared his win with Ben Grossmann, Alex Henning and Robert Legato.

During the In Memoriam presentation at the 92nd Academy Awards in 2020, Williams was listed amongst those being paid tribute to, revealing his death.

References

Visual effects supervisors
Best Visual Effects Academy Award winners
Year of birth missing
Place of birth missing
Year of death uncertain